Ironshire is an unincorporated community in Worcester County, Maryland, United States. Ironshire is located at the intersection of U.S. Route 113 and Ironshire Station Road/Mason Road, south of Berlin.

Simpson's Grove was listed on the National Register of Historic Places in 1996.

References

Unincorporated communities in Worcester County, Maryland
Unincorporated communities in Maryland